is a short motorway in Hamburg, in north Germany. It connects the A 252 with the B 75. Following the rerouting of Wilhelm Reichsstraße, the A 253 was downgraded to B 75 on 6 October 2019.

Exit list 

 
  

  continue as B 75
|}

External links 

253
A253